The 2011–12 GMHL season was the sixth season of the Greater Metro Junior A Hockey League (GMHL). The fourteen teams of the GMHL played 42-game schedules.

Starting in February 2012, the top teams of the league played down for the Russell Cup, emblematic of the grand championship of the GMHL.  Since the GMHL is independent from Hockey Canada and the Canadian Junior Hockey League, this is where the GMHL's season ended.  The league champion was the Sturgeon Falls Lumberjacks as they defeated the Temiscaming Titans 4-games-to-2.

Changes 
Expansion granted to the Orangeville Americans.
Expansion granted to the Mattawa Voyageurs.
Expansion granted to the Temiscaming Titans.
Expansion granted to the Vaughan Stars.
Powassan Dragons renamed the Powassan Eagles.
Vaughan Wild moved and renamed the Lefroy Wave.
Oro-Medonte 77's leave league.
Jamestown Jets leave league over arena dispute.
Halton Huskies granted expansion for 2012-13.
Powassan Eagles take one-year leave.
Vaughan Stars league membership revoked November 28, 2011.

Current standings 
Note: GP = Games played; W = Wins; L = Losses; OTL = Overtime losses; SL = Shootout losses; GF = Goals for; GA = Goals against; PTS = Points; x = clinched playoff berth; y = clinched division title; z = clinched conference title

Vaughan is shaded due to their membership being revoked during a league meeting November 28, 2011 for failing to attend mandatory GMHL Showcase Tournament.  Their remaining 26 games were awarded to their opponents as 3–0 victories.

Teams listed on the official league website.

Standings listed on official league website.

2011–12 Russell Cup Playoffs

Playoff results are listed on the official league website.

All-Star Game
The 2011–12 GMHL All-Star Game was hosted by Gravenhurst, Ontario on January 10, 2012.

Result:
Team North America 9 - Team World 7

Scoring leaders 
Note: GP = Games played; G = Goals; A = Assists; Pts = Points; PIM = Penalty minutes

Leading goaltenders 
Note: GP = Games played; Mins = Minutes played; W = Wins; L = Losses: OTL = Overtime losses; SL = Shootout losses; GA = Goals Allowed; SO = Shutouts; GAA = Goals against average

Awards
Scoring Leader - Andre Leclair (Temiscaming Titans)
Most Valuable Player - Andre Leclair (Temiscaming Titans)
Top Forward - Illes Gallo (Sturgeon Falls Lumberjacks)
Top Defensive Forward - Myles Neuneker (Bradford Rattlers)
Top Defenseman - Ryan Tremmel (Lefroy Wave)
Top Goalie - Andrew Selbie (Bobcaygeon Bucks)
Top Rookie - Tomas Nemeth (Elliot Lake Bobcats)
Most Sportsmanlike Player - John Sweet (Deseronto Storm)
Heart Award - Tyler Roache (Lefroy Wave)
Top Coach - Tyler Fines (Orangeville Americans)

See also 
 2011 in ice hockey
 2012 in ice hockey

References

External links 
 Official website of the Greater Metro Junior A Hockey League

Greater Metro Junior A Hockey League seasons
GMHL